The Sound of '70s is the third solo studio album by Yoshinori Sunahara. It was released on Ki/oon Records on November 11, 1998. It was created as an homage to Pan American World Airways.

Critical reception

Ben Davies of AllMusic gave the album 3 out of 5 stars, calling it "a far cry from an essential purchase."

Track listing

References

External links
 

1998 albums
Yoshinori Sunahara albums
Ki/oon Records albums